The 2006–07 season of the GNF 2 second division of Moroccan football.

Teams 

 Chabab Mohammédia
 Chabab Houara
 KAC Kenitra
 FUS de Rabat
 Union de Touarga
 Racing Casablanca
 Stade Marocain
 Tihad Témara
 Renaissance Berkane
 Renaissance de Settat
 Hilal de Nador
 Wafa Wydad
 Union Sidi Kacem
 Rachad Bernoussi
 Union Mohammédia
 Youssoufia Berrechid

Final league table

References
 The Rec.Sport.Soccer Statistics Foundation

GNF 2 seasons
Moro
2006–07 in Moroccan football